Allan Boardman, British physicist
Andrea Boardman (born 1967), English television presenter
Ben Boardman (1899–1968), English footballer
Chris Boardman (born 1968), British cyclist
Christopher Boardman (1903–1987), British sailor
David Sherman Boardman (1786–1864), American lawyer, judge, and politician
Dixon Boardman (1880–1954), American track and field athlete
Edward Boardman (1833-1910), English architect
Eileen Boardman (c.1942–2018), American statistician
Eleanor Boardman (1898–1991), American film actress
Elijah Boardman (1760–1823), American politician
George Boardman (missionary) (1801–1831), American missionary to Burma
George Boardman the Younger (1828–1903), American theologian
Halsey J. Boardman (1834-date of death unknown), American politician
Harold Boardman (1907–1994), British politician
Harry Boardman (1930–1987), English folk singer
Humphrey Boardman (1904-1998), English rower
John Boardman (physicist) (born 1932), physicist, author and game authority
John Boardman (art historian) (born 1927), British art historian and archaeologist
John Joseph Boardman (1893–1978), American Roman Catholic bishop
Jon Boardman (born 1981), English footballer
Joseph H. Boardman (1948–2019), American government official
Josephine Porter Boardman (1873–1972), American philanthropist
Larry Boardman (born 1936), American boxer
Lee Boardman (born 1972), English actor
Leslie Boardman (1889-1975), Australian freestyle swimmer 
Mabel Thorp Boardman (1860–1946), American philanthropist
Michael Boardman (1938–2021), British mathematician
Mickey Boardman, editorial director and advice columnist for PAPER Magazine
Paul Boardman (born 1967), British television presenter
Paul Harris Boardman, American film producer and screenwriter
Peter Boardman (1950–1982), British mountain climber
Sarah Hall Boardman (1803–1845), American missionary to Burma
Seymour Boardman (1921–2005), New York abstract expressionist painter
Stan Boardman (born 1940), English comedian
Steve Boardman (historian), Scottish medieval historian
Steve Boardman (soccer) (born 1964), retired American soccer defender
Thomas Volney Boardman, American businessman
Tom Boardman, Baron Boardman (1919–2003), British politician and businessman
Tom Boardman (racing driver) (born 1983), British racing driver
True Boardman (1882–1918), American film actor
Truman Boardman (1810–1895), New york politician
Virginia True Boardman (1889–1971), American actress
William Boardman (1810–1886), American pastor, teacher, and author
William K. Boardman (1915–1993), American politician
William Whiting Boardman (1794–1871), American politician